is a private university in the town of Fukusaki in Hyōgo Prefecture, Japan. The school was first founded as a junior women's college in 1973. In 2000 it became a co-ed four-year college.

External links
 Official website 

Educational institutions established in 1973
Private universities and colleges in Japan
Universities and colleges in Hyōgo Prefecture
1973 establishments in Japan
Fukusaki, Hyōgo